Girsby is a village and civil parish in Hambleton District of North Yorkshire, England. The village lies on high ground on the eastern bank of the River Tees.  The population of the parish was estimated at 40 in 2010. The population as of the 2011 census remained less than 100. Details are included in the civil parish of Over Dinsdale.

Historically the village was a township in the ancient parish of Sockburn, a parish divided by the River Tees between the North Riding of Yorkshire (which included Girsby) and County Durham (which included the township of Sockburn).  Girsby became a separate civil parish in 1866.

The settlement has fallen into disrepair, many of the remaining buildings are derelict, there are barely enough houses to constitute a hamlet.

The small and secluded 'Girsby All Saints Church' overlooks the meandering Tees from its elevated position. The views from this vantage point are most enjoyable at sunset.

A private farmers track leads down to a rarely used bridge over the Tees. A public bridle path crosses the bridge linking Girsby with the nearby village of Neasham on the opposite bank of the river. A plaque on the bridge is inscribed;

Bridle Bridge,

Erected by Theophania Blackett 1870,

Thomas Dyke Esq Civil Engineer.

This engineer from Newcastle owned much land in this area, he erected the church at Girsby after the ruins of Sockburn church were no longer visitable, the church was built for the equivalent price today of £14.67

The name bridle may refer to the historic right of way called bridleway.

References

External links

Villages in North Yorkshire
Civil parishes in North Yorkshire
Hambleton District